Marek Plawgo (born 25 February 1981 in Ruda Śląska) is a Polish athlete. He mainly competes in the 400 meters hurdles, but he also starts in the 400 meters and the 4 x 400 meters relay.

Although Plawgo lives in Bytom, he represents KS Warszawianka Warszawa. His most important event is the 400 meters hurdles. He is the holder of the national record of Poland with 48.12s. gained during the 2007 World Championships in Osaka. Plawgo also holds the Polish indoor record in the flat 400 meters with his time of 45.39, which was achieved during the 2002 European Indoor Championships in Vienna. He's a multiple-time champion of Poland in the 400 meters hurdles. In this event, the KS Warszawianka athlete finished the national championships first in 2001, 2003 and in the years 2005–2009.

Introduction to the career
Before starting the professional career, in 2000, Plawgo won the gold medal at the World Junior Championships in Santiago de Chile and finished third with his colleagues from the 4x400 meters relay. Several months later in Osaka, the 19-year-old Pole gained a great time of 48.16s and broke the national record of Paweł Januszewski (48.17s.). The achievement was repeated by Plawgo in the semi-final of the 2004 Summer Olympics in Athens.

Career as a senior athlete
At the 2002 European Indoor Championships in Vienna, the Pole was first in the 400 meters and won another gold in the 4x400 meters relay. The line-up of the Polish relay was Plawgo, Piotr Rysiukiewicz, Artur Gąsiewski and Robert Maćkowiak. One year later, at the European U-23 Championships in Bydgoszcz, Plawgo finished first with a good result of 48.45s.

Quite disappointing for Plawgo could be the 2004 Summer Olympics. The sportsman from Bytom was one of the Polish medal hopes. However, the best he could achieve was the 6th place in the Olympic Final. Plawgo was also a member of the Polish 4x400 meters relay (Piotr Klimczak, Marcin Marciniszyn, Plawgo and Rysiukiewicz) which didn't manage to qualify to the final and was classified on the 10th position.

During the 2006 European Championships in Goeteborg, Plawgo won a silver medal in the 400 meters hurdles. His result in the final was 48.71s. One year later, in June, the Pole finished second at the Super League in Munich. Originally, the winner, Periklís Iakovákis, was disqualified by the judges but later the decision was altered and the Greek remained first.

The World Championships in Osaka
The biggest success of Plawgo in the professional career was achieved in 2007, during the World Championships in Osaka. The Japanese city, in which he set the national record in 2000, remained lucky for the hurdler and he finished the competitions with two bronze medals. First of them was won, obviously, in the 400 meters hurdles. The Pole was outpaced only by the Dominican legend Felix Sanchez (silver medal – 48.01s.) and magnificent Kerron Clement who finished first with 47.61s., establishing the best 2007 result in this event. Plawgo broke his own record of Poland with 48.12s. The Polish 4x400 meters relay was third in the final with 3:00:05, losing to the USA (2:55:56) and Bahamas (2:59:18). The final line-up was Plawgo, Daniel Dąbrowski, Marciniszyn and Kacper Kozłowski.

After the successful 2007
After the championships in Osaka, Plawgo won three meetings. The most valuable victory was the first position at the Golden League meeting in Berlin, with 49.01s. The most successful year in the '81 born sportsman's career was crowned by winning the IAAF World Final in Stuttgart with satisfying 48.36s. Plawgo was granted the prize of the best athlete of September 2007 by the European Association of Athletics. He was classified on the second position by "Track and Fields News" magazine in their ranking of the best 400 meters hurdles runners in 2007 and on the third place in the IAAF world ranking. What's more, Plawgo came 7th in the contest of "Przegląd Sportowy" (the only sport daily newspaper in Poland) and was the winner of "Złote Kolce" contest in 2007.

Before the 2008 Summer Games in Beijing, Plawgo became a medal hope of Polish fans again. Unfortunately, several weeks before the Olympic Games beginning, the Polish athlete caught an injury of his foot, which complicated his preparations to the most significant competitions of the season. Nevertheless, Plawgo made a good impression in Beijing. He repeated his '2004 performance and finished 6th with 48.52s.

Competition record

See also
 Polish records in athletics

References

External links
 

1981 births
Living people
Sportspeople from Ruda Śląska
Polish male hurdlers
Athletes (track and field) at the 2004 Summer Olympics
Athletes (track and field) at the 2008 Summer Olympics
Olympic athletes of Poland
World Athletics Championships athletes for Poland
World Athletics Championships medalists
European Athletics Championships medalists
World Athletics Indoor Championships medalists
21st-century Polish people